Infantry Battalion 714 or 714th Infantry Battalion is an infantry battalion of the Indonesian Army formed in 2004 as a result of the conflict in Poso, Central Sulawesi. The formation of the battalion was formed from taking A and B companies from the 711th Infantry Battalion (Yonif 711/Raksatama). This battalion is part of Korem 132/Tadulako Kodam XIII/Merdeka, which is the military regional command which partially covers the island of Sulawesi.

Battalions of Indonesia
Military units and formations established in 2005